Publius Septimius Geta (fl. 2nd century, c. 110 – 171) was the father of the emperor Lucius Septimius Severus, father-in-law of the Roman empress Julia Domna and the paternal grandfather of the Roman emperors Caracalla and Geta. Besides mentions in the Historia Augusta, Geta is known from several inscriptions, two of which were found in Leptis Magna, Africa (East of Tripoli in modern Libya).

Early life 
Geta was of Punic origin. His family were local, wealthy and distinguished in Leptis Magna, a prominent city of the Carthaginian Empire, founded by Phoenicians. His father, Lucius Septimius Severus (c. 70 – aft. 110) was sufes and prefectus when Leptis was made a colonia and its inhabitants were granted citizenship under Trajan; Lucius was the first duumvir of the new colonia (IRT 412). He is likely the wealthy equestrian that is highly commemorated by the Flavian dynasty poet Statius (Silvae 4.5, 4.praef.). Geta's paternal grandparents were Marcus Septimius Aper (born c. 35), and possibly an Octavia. Geta also had a sister named Septimia Polla, who apparently never married; Geta honored her memory with a silver statue.

While Geta seems to have held no political offices, either local or imperial, other members of his family were distinguished. He had two cousins, who served as Consuls under Roman Emperor Antoninus Pius: Gaius Septimius Severus, suffect consul in 160; and Publius Septimius Aper, suffect consul in July 153. Another relative of his was Gaius Septimius Severus Aper, ordinary consul in 207.

Family 
Geta married Fulvia Pia (c. 125 – bef. 198), a woman of Roman descent belonging to the gens Fulvia, an Italian patrician family that originated in Tusculum.

He died after his son Septimius had achieved the rank of quaestor, and was about to set off for Baetica to serve as proconsul, i.e. in 171. Septimius was forced to return to Africa to settle his father's affairs.

Severan dynasty family tree

References

External links
 http://www.roman-emperors.org/sepsev.htm
 https://web.archive.org/web/20000819000400/http://www.roman-empire.net/decline/sept-severus.html
 http://penelope.uchicago.edu/Thayer/E/Roman/Texts/Historia_Augusta/Septimius_Severus*.html
 https://web.archive.org/web/20080108231453/http://www.ga.k12.pa.us/academics/MS/8th/romanhis/Forum/mattb/severus/index.htm

Family of Septimius Severus
Septimii
2nd-century Romans
2nd-century Punic people
110 births
171 deaths
Year of birth uncertain